Malkov is a Russian masculine surname, its feminine counterpart is Malkova. It may refer to:

Anatoli Malkov (born 1981), Russian football player
Igor Malkov (born 1965), Russian speedskater
Konstantin Malkov, American mathematician and businessman
Mia Malkova (born 1992), American pornographic film actress
Vladimir Malkov (disambiguation)
Yevgeni Malkov (born 1988), Russian football player

See also
 Málkov (disambiguation)
 Málek

Russian-language surnames